Les Lèves-et-Thoumeyragues is a commune in the Gironde department in Nouvelle-Aquitaine in southwestern France. It is sometimes referred to as Les Lèves.

Geography
The closest town is Sainte-Foy-la-Grande.

Population

Wine
Les Lèves-et-Thoumeyragues is in the heart of the easternmost wine growing commune within the Bordeaux appellation. Univitis which is the largest group of wine producers in Bordeaux and southwestern France, is based in the village. Univitis owns most of the vineyards around the village, and in size makes up half of the commune.

There are also a number of independent wine producers based in the village, such as Chateau La Tour de Chollet.

See also
 Communes of the Gironde department
 Bordeaux wine

References

External links

 www.les-leves.com A website with photographs and current affairs about Lèves-et-Thoumeyragues, by a resident photographer.
 Univitis home page (English language)

Communes of Gironde